Barnstaple Quay was an intermediate station on the L&SWR line to Ilfracombe in Devon, England. The station opened in 1874, and located on the north bank of the River Taw close to the centre of Barnstaple, was renamed Barnstaple Town in 1886.  With the opening of the Lynton and Barnstaple Railway in 1898, the station was relocated to its present site, to accommodate passenger exchange to the narrow gauge line. The station became the town's bus station, but this closed in 1999 and the building then became a café when a new and larger bus station was opened closer to the town centre.

References

See also
 Ilfracombe Branch Line

Quay railway station
Disused railway stations in Devon
Former London and South Western Railway stations
Railway stations in Great Britain opened in 1874
Railway stations in Great Britain closed in 1898
Former bus stations